Bègles is a railway station in the Bègles, a suburb of Bordeaux, Nouvelle-Aquitaine, France. The station is located on the Bordeaux–Sète railway line. The station is served by TER (local) services operated by SNCF.

Train services
The following services currently call at Bègles:
local service (TER Nouvelle-Aquitaine) Bordeaux - Langon

See also
 B81693 at Bègles
 Z7323 at Bègles
 Infra Loco on a passing freight

References

Railway stations in France opened in 1855
Railway stations in Gironde